Embiotoca is a genus of surfperches native to the eastern Pacific Ocean.

Species
There are currently two recognized species in this genus:
 Embiotoca jacksoni Agassiz, 1853 (Black surfperch)
 Embiotoca lateralis Agassiz, 1854 (Striped surfperch)

References

External links

 
Embiotocidae
Marine fish genera
Taxa named by Louis Agassiz